Deferunda is a genus of achilid planthoppers in the family Achilidae. There are about 13 described species in Deferunda.

Species
These 13 species belong to the genus Deferunda:

 Deferunda acuminata Chou & Wang, 1985 c g
 Deferunda albomaculata (Muir, 1922) c g
 Deferunda diana Chen & He, 2010 c g
 Deferunda incompta Dlabola, 1961 c g
 Deferunda lineola (Matsumura, 1914) c g
 Deferunda majella (Kirkaldy, 1906) c g
 Deferunda philippina (Melichar, 1914) c g
 Deferunda qiana Chen & He, 2010 c g
 Deferunda rubrostigmata (Matsumura, 1914) c g
 Deferunda stigmatica Distant, 1912 c g
 Deferunda striata Wang & Liu, 2008 c g
 Deferunda trimaculata Wang & Peng, 2008 c g
 Deferunda truncata Chen, Yang & Wilson, 1989 c g

Data sources: i = ITIS, c = Catalogue of Life, g = GBIF, b = Bugguide.net

References

Further reading

 
 
 
 
 

Achilidae
Auchenorrhyncha genera